Johanna Schindler (born 8 July 1994) is an Austrian handballer for Hypo Niederösterreich and the Austrian national team.

She represented Austria at the 2021 World Women's Handball Championship, placing 16th.

References

1994 births
Living people
Austrian female handball players
Handball players from Vienna